The Tongji Bridge, commonly known as North Gate Bridge, is a historic stone arch bridge over the Zhang River in the town of , Yi County, Anhui, China.

History
The original bridge dates back to 1178, during the Chunxi period of the Southern Song dynasty (1127–1279), and rebuilt in 1541, during the ruling of Jiajing Emperor of the Ming dynasty (1368–1644). In the 19th year of Qianlong period (1754) of the Qing dynasty (1644–1911), it was rebuilt again and changed to its current name. It was renovated and refurbished in 1883 and 1982, respectively.

References

Bridges in Anhui
Arch bridges in China
Bridges completed in 1754
Qing dynasty architecture
Buildings and structures completed in 1754
1754 establishments in China